Odem ( or ) is an Israeli settlement and moshav shitufi in the northern part of the Golan Heights. It is surrounded by the Odem Forest and falls under the jurisdiction of Golan Regional Council.

The international community considers Israeli settlements in the Golan Heights illegal under international law, but the Israeli government disputes this.

Etymology
Odem means ruby and signifies the red color. In this case it refers to the color of the rocks of Mount Odem, an extinct volcano.

History
The Israeli government approved the establishment of the settlement in 1975, and a group of young people occupied an abandoned Syrian military base nearby. Most of these original settlers left, however, because of the frigid temperatures and strong winds. Those that remained were joined in 1981 by a new group, and the current settlement was established. The population was about 150 in 1993, about one-third of them children.

Economy
The chief industries are a factory that manufactures plastic for furniture and an optics factory that manufactures protective lenses and safety goggles. Odem Mountain Winery is also located there.

See also
Israeli Military Governorate

References

Israeli settlements in the Golan Heights
Moshavim
Golan Regional Council
Populated places in Northern District (Israel)
Populated places established in 1975
1975 establishments in the Israeli Military Governorate